Rokitnica may refer to the following places in Poland:
Rokitnica, Lower Silesian Voivodeship (south-west Poland)
Rokitnica, Łask County in Łódź Voivodeship (central Poland)
Rokitnica, Zgierz County in Łódź Voivodeship (central Poland)
Rokitnica, Masovian Voivodeship (east-central Poland)
Rokitnica, Lubusz Voivodeship (west Poland)
Rokitnica, Pomeranian Voivodeship (north Poland)